The 1998–99 Turkish Ice Hockey Super League season was the seventh season of the Turkish Ice Hockey Super League, the top level of ice hockey in Turkey. Eight teams participated in the league.

Regular season

Playoffs

Semifinals 
 Gümüş Patenler - Bogazici PSK Ankara 3:1
 Büyükşehir Belediyesi Ankara Spor Kulübü - İstanbul Paten Spor Kulübü 0:7

3rd place 
 Büyükşehir Belediyesi Ankara Spor Kulübü - Bogazici PSK Ankara 5:2

Final 
 Gümüş Patenler - İstanbul Paten Spor Kulübü 4:3 OT

External links
 Season on hockeyarchives.info

TBHSL
Turkish Ice Hockey Super League seasons
TBSHL